"Livin' in These Troubled Times" is a song written by Sam Hogin, Roger Cook and Philip Donnelly, and recorded by American country music artist Crystal Gayle.  It was released in August 1982 as the third single from the album Hollywood, Tennessee.  The song reached number 9 on the Billboard Hot Country Singles & Tracks chart.

Chart performance

References

1982 singles
1981 songs
Crystal Gayle songs
Songs written by Roger Cook (songwriter)
Song recordings produced by Allen Reynolds
Warner Records singles
Songs written by Sam Hogin